General elections were held in Costa Rica on 6 February 1994. José María Figueres of the National Liberation Party won the presidential election, whilst his party also won the parliamentary election. Voter turnout was 81.1%.

Campaign
The primary election were the main focus of controversy during the campaign, as they were particularly negative. In the case of the Social Christian Unity Party (PUSC), Miguel Ángel Rodríguez Echeverría made a second attempt to earn the nomination running against José Joaquín Trejos Fonseca, son of former president José Joaquín Trejos Fernández. The campaign was very ideological with Trejos accusing Rodríguez of not really being Christian Democrat nor following the ideals of Christian socialism and instead being neoliberal. Rodríguez indeed acknowledged to follow classical liberalism and advocated for small government, but without completely abandon Christian Democracy's ideas.

PLN's primary was more focus on personal attacks. In it José María Figueres Olsen, son of PLN's caudillo and former president José Figueres Ferrer, faced popular anti-corruption and anti-narcotraffic deputy José Miguel Corrales, alongside other candidates like former First Lady Margarita Penón (wife of Óscar Arias) and San José Mayor Rolando Araya (nephew of former president Luis Alberto Monge). Thus, most candidates except Corrales came from important political families. Figueres' image was affected by the "Chemise Case", the allegations that he was involved in the murder of a young drug dealer while in custody during one of his father's governments. Figueres sued the authors of the book accusing him, and won, but the controversy was still used by Corrales in campaign, to no avail as Figueres won the primary election. Corrales did not support him afterward.

The negative campaign continue after the primaries. Rodríguez used the "Chemise Case" too and also accused Figueres of not being Catholic and belonging to the Christian Science cult, of having a military upraising due to his father's past as revolutionary caudillo and the fact that he's a West Point graduate, etc., in order to caused fear of an authoritarian government. Figueres campaign on the other hand tried to show Rodríguez as a cold, heartless entrepreneur with neoliberal ideas as a counterpart to Figueres socialdemocratic ideology.

Results

President

By province

Legislative Assembly

By province

Local governments

Ballot

References

Costa Rica
1994 in Costa Rica
Elections in Costa Rica